"Stop, Drop and Roll" is a single released by New Zealand hip hop artist, Mareko featuring the Deceptikonz.  The single was released in 2003 and hit #6 on the New Zealand charts.

It also has music video directed by Sophie Findlay which is a "humorous take" on various army films like Full Metal Jacket. In it Mareko (playing the Commanding Officer) and his troops (the Deceptikonz) bark orders and harass recruits.

Track listings
Stop, Drop & Roll featuring Deceptikonz
Stop, Drop & Roll (Instrumental)
Stop, Drop & Roll (41:30 Remix) featuring Deceptikonz, Scribe & Flowz
Stop, Drop & Roll (Video)

References

2003 singles
Mareko songs
2003 songs
Song articles with missing songwriters